Vanessa McCarthy is an American television producer and writer.

Her television writing credits include Friends, Abby, Modern Family and also producing and writing for Joey and Hot in Cleveland.

She was a head writer and executive producer for the sitcom Rules of Engagement.

Awards
In 2004, she won The Robert Meltzer Writers Guild of America Award for her work on the animated sitcom Father of the Pride, as a part of the writing team.

References

External links

Living people
American television producers
American women television producers
American television writers
American women television writers
Place of birth missing (living people)
Year of birth missing (living people)
Robert Meltzer Award winners
21st-century American women